Yechezkel Sarna (1890–1969) was a disciple of Nosson Tzvi Finkel, (known as the "Alter (elder) of Slabodka"), spiritual mentor of the Slabodka yeshiva. He was sent by Finkel to move the yeshiva from Europe to Hebron in 1925, and following the 1929 Hebron massacre, to Jerusalem. In 1934, he assumed the position of rosh yeshiva. Over the years, he produced thousands of students, many of whom became prominent roshei yeshiva and rabbis in Israel and abroad.

Early years
Sarna was born in Horodok, Russia, on 28 Shevat in 1890. His father, Yaakov Chaim, was the city's shochet and melamed, and later its maggid. Sarna's mother, Aidel, was the daughter of Shlomo Zalman Buxenbaum, a hassid of the Chiddushei Harim, and author of Rechovos Ir, a commentary on Midrash Rabba. Sarna received his primary education from his father, as well as at the cheder in Horodok.

When he was 11, he was sent to the Ohr Hachaim yeshiva in Slabodka, headed by Tzvi Levitan, a student of the Simcha Zissel Ziv, "the Alter of Kelm". During the year that he studied there, he was exposed to the musar teachings of the mashgiach, Eliyahu Laicrovits.

In 1902, he journeyed to Maltsch to study under Zalman Sender Kahana-Shapiro, who also presided as the Chief Rabbi of the city. Due to an internal conflict in the yeshiva, Kahana-Shapiro left Maltsch, and transferred to Kriniki, barely a year after Sarna had arrived. Without a mentor, Sarna left Maltsch. A year later, he returned to Slabodka to study under Chaim Rabinowitz in Knesses Beis Yitzchok.

In 1904, Rabinowitz invited Sarna to join a group of select students he took along with him while being transferred to the Telz Yeshiva. When the yeshiva temporarily closed in 1906, Sarna returned to Maltsch, studying under Shimon Shkop. One year later, he returned to Knesses Yisroel Yeshiva in Slabodka, where he became one of the yeshiva's best students. He drew attention of Ziv, who played a major role in his spiritual growth. Describing their special relationship, Sarna wrote, "Without the Alter, I would have been like a blind and a deaf person. He opened my eyes and my ears, and I acquired my entire approach to Torah study from him."

World War I 
With the outbreak of World War I, the entire Slabodka yeshiva fled to Minsk. Like all of the yeshiva's students, Sarna secured forged affidavits in order to avoid the draft. However, he was caught and imprisoned. He managed to escape from prison and flee to the home of a relative, Yehoshua Zimbalist. Soon after, he escaped to Smilowitz where the Chofetz Chaim and his students had taken refuge.

Shortly after the Slabodka yeshiva had arrived in Minsk, which was near the battlefront, it was forced to flee to a safer city, Kremenchuk. However, Sarna chose not to join the yeshiva, but remained in Smilowitz, studying for a year and a half in an inn with the students of the Raduń Yeshiva. During this period, he developed close relationships with the Chofetz Chaim and Raduń's rosh yeshiva, Naftoli Trop, and later referenced this brief period as one of the most beautiful in his life.

After the revolution, Sarna returned to the Knesses Yisroel yeshiva in Kremenchuk. Two years later, he married Pesha Miriam Epstein, the daughter of Moshe Mordechai Epstein, one of the yeshiva heads.

Shortly after World War I, the yeshiva managed to leave Russia and to return to Slabodka, which, after the war, was re-annexed to Lithuania. At one point, Ziv asked Sarna to deliver shiurim (lectures) in the yeshiva, but he declined the offer, explaining that he preferred to devote the early years of his life to Torah study. Although Sarna held no official position in the yeshiva, his influence there was keenly felt.

Palestine

In 1924, following the edict requiring enlistment in the military or supplementary secular studies in the yeshiva, the decision was made to transfer the yeshiva to Eretz Yisroel. Sarna was sent to Eretz Yisroel to choose a site for the yeshiva and to coordinate its establishment there. After evaluating various options he chose the city of Hebron. Consequently, Knesses Yisroel became the first Lithuanian yeshiva to transfer to Eretz Yisroel. At that period, Sarna assumed a significant role in the yeshiva's leadership, delivering shiurim (lectures) and coordinating study schedules. In the beginning of 1927, the Alter fell seriously ill, and Sarna began to deliver musar discourses in the yeshiva.

In the course of the 1929 Hebron massacre, 24 of the yeshiva's students had been killed and many were injured. Sarna succeeded in reestablishing the yeshiva in Jerusalem. He renamed it "Hebron", in memory of those who were massacred in that city. While Leib Chasman, the yeshiva's mashgiach, dedicated himself to encouraging the students, Sarna took the task of fund raising for the yeshiva, traveling extensively, even making several trips to the United States. 

In a letter to Isaac Sher of Slabodka, he wrote, "The first weeks were very difficult, since the students were both destitute and despondent. But by the 15th of Elul, they returned to themselves, and by Rosh Hashana, the yeshiva began to function in full force."

When his father-in-law, Moshe Mordechai, died in 1933, four years after the Hebron Massacre, Rav Yechezkel was officially appointed rosh yeshiva of Hebron.

Community involvement and leadership
With the start of World War II and the Holocaust, Sarna expanded the scope of his activities: he was among the founders of the Vaad Yeshivos, and was also active in the Vaad Hatzalah. After the founding of the State of Israel, Sarna served as one of the leaders of the Chinuch Atzmai Torah School Network. Although he shunned direct political involvement, Rabbi Sarna had a strong affinity for Agudas Yisroel, and he was an active member of its Council of Torah Sages.

Despite the involvement in community and Jewish projects, the Hebron yeshiva and its students remained his lifework. He delivered shiurim in halacha and musar every week at the yeshiva and in his own home. For seven years, he also delivered discourses on the laws and meaning of Shabbat. In 1936, with the passing of the yeshiva's mashgiach, Yehuda Leib Chasman, Sarna assumed that role himself.

As rosh yeshiva and mashgiach, he acted warmly toward his students. This attitude is apparent in one of his letters, in which he wrote, "Yesterday, I entered the yeshiva close to midnight, and found thirty students studying with exceptional fervor. At that time, I thought, 'Fortunate is the generation which has merited such young people. May Hashem protect them and bless them.'"
Over time, his brothers-in-law, Rabbis Aaron Cohen and Moshe Chevroni, were appointed roshei yeshiva of Hebron, while Meir Chadash was appointed mashgiach. Later, Rabbis Hillel Paley, Simcha Zissel Broide and Avrohom Farbstein were also invited to become roshei yeshiva there.

Final days
In his last months, Sarna kept davening at the yeshiva and delivering shiurim. In 1969, he was taken to Hadassah Ein Kerem Hospital for intensive treatment. Two days before his death, he was reported to have said, "It is Elul and the students are surely studying with added hasmada. My illness won't disturb their Elul mood." He died on 6 Elul and was buried beside his father-in-law, Moshe Mordechai Epstein, on the Mount of Olives.

Family
Sarna and his wife Pesha Miriam had one son, Chaim. Their daughter Chana (married name Farbstein) was born 1923.

Works
 Rearrangement of the Kuzari by Rav. Sarna, Transl. Rabbi Avraham Davis; Metsudah 1986
 Iyunim on Mesilat Yesharim available at http://hebrewbooks.org/41769
 Daliot Yechezkel

References

1890 births
1969 deaths
Israeli Rosh yeshivas
Haredi rabbis in Europe
Haredi rabbis in Israel
Burials at the Jewish cemetery on the Mount of Olives

he:חיים סרנא